The phrase WAC basketball tournament may refer to:

WAC men's basketball tournament
WAC women's basketball tournament